The women's rhythmic individual ball competition at the 2015 European Games was held at the National Gymnastics Arena on 21 June 2015. The six best results from the All-Around Final qualified in the Final, with one gymnast allowed per country.

Results

References 

Women's rhythmic individual ball